The University of Buner is a public university located in Buner, Khyber Pakhtunkhwa, Pakistan.

Overview and history 
University of Buner was approved by the Government of Khyber Pakhtunkhwa in November 2012 with Dr Muhammad Farooq as project director.  The university is being built on Abdul Wali Khan University Mardan Buner campus, which is now upgraded to a full-fledged university by the Khyber Pakhtunkhwa.

Departments 
The university currently has 7 departments.
 Department of Zoology
 Department of Computer Science
 Department of Management Sciences
 Department of Economics
 Department of Electronics
 Department of Political Science.
 Department of English

See also
 Abdul Wali Khan University
 University of Swat
 University of Chitral

References

Public universities and colleges in Khyber Pakhtunkhwa
Educational institutions established in 2017
2017 establishments in Pakistan
Buner District